Alaksandar Uładzimieravič Milinkievič (born 25 July 1947 in Grodno) is a Belarusian politician. He was nominated by the leading opposition parties in Belarus to run against incumbent Alexander Lukashenko in the 2006 presidential election.

Biography
Milinkevič was born in 1947 in Grodno. After graduating from the University of Grodno, he defended his Ph.D.  thesis at the Institute of Physics of the National Academy of Sciences of Belarus. Between 1980 and 1984 he was in charge of the (then forming) Faculty of Physics at the University of Sétif in Algiers. He also served as a docent at the University of Grodno between 1978 and 1980, and then from 1984 on to 1990. At that time he also started to cooperate with local city authorities as chief of one of the committees. Soon he reached the rank of deputy mayor of the city.

In 2001 he was the chief of staff of Siamion Domash, one of the opposition leaders running for president in the 2001 presidential elections of Belarus. In October 2005 he was chosen by the United Democratic Forces of Belarus as the joint candidate of the opposition in the presidential elections of 2006.

On 12 December 2006 he was awarded the Sakharov Prize by the European Parliament.

He is the recipient of the seventh Hanno R. Ellenbogen Citizenship Award, awarded annually by Prague Society for International Cooperation and the Global Panel Foundation (de).

Campaign for presidency
In October 2005, at a Congress of Democratic Forces, roughly 900 delegates from various political and civil society groups met in the capital Minsk to pick a single opposition candidate for the 2006 Presidential election. Milinkievič won over three other political leaders at the meeting (including Stanislav Shushkevich and Anatoly Lebedko). The unification process has the aim of selecting a single opposition figure who would run against President Lukashenko, who has run Belarus for over a decade. Belarus' opposition forces had previously tried to field a single candidate in the 2001 presidential elections.

Milinkievič compared his campaign to that of another pro-Western opposition candidate in neighboring Ukraine, Viktor Yushchenko, whose victory in late 2004 was dubbed the "Orange Revolution". Although disappointment in Yushchenko's government culminated in a political crisis in September 2005 amid renewed allegations of mass graft coupled with a worsening economic situation, Milinkievič calls last year's events in Ukraine an inspiration for his supporters. "We believe that Belarus will be next after… Ukraine," he told Associated Press.

However, opposition leaders realize that an uphill struggle lies ahead, despite their support from U.S.-funded NGOs. Lukashenko's market socialism economy has significant support in rural areas of the country. Belarus is one of the few areas of the Soviet Union where the country's social welfare network remains virtually unchanged since the Soviet era.

In the 2006 presidential election official results gave Milinkievič 6% of the vote against 83% for the incumbent Lukashenko. Confiscation of his leaflets during the campaign was found by the UN Human Rights Committee to violate his rights.

In January 2006 Milinkievič was invited to Paris by the French government. He met with the French Minister of Foreign Affairs, and gave numerous interviews to Western media, including a TV interview to Euronews. Milinkievič, just like any other opposition activist, has absolutely no TV access inside Belarus, as the media in Belarus are state-controlled. The only exception when he was allowed to appear on Belarusian television was his pre-election speech in 2006. Earlier, he had already met the new Polish prime minister Kazimierz Marcinkiewicz, and the president of Lithuania Valdas Adamkus. In February 2006 he also met the President of the European Commission, José Manuel Barroso, German Chancellor Angela Merkel, Javier Solana, and several other top European politicians. His campaign received the backing first of the Polish government and later that of prominent EU officials.

Personal life
Currently married to Inna Kuley, he has two sons from a previous marriage. Aside from his native Belarusian Milinkievič also speaks Polish, French, and Russian.

Persecution
In April 2006, Milinkievič was jailed by the government for 15 days for taking part in an unsanctioned rally.

On 23 November 2006 government police detained Milinkievič three times as he traveled around Vitebsk Region with a local opposition activist who was accused of causing a fatal hit-and-run accident in the past.  On 29 November 2006 police detained Milinkievič at a Minsk airport after he returned from a NATO summit in Riga. He was accused of having a forged  passport.

On 4 December 2006 Milinkievič was detained in Beloozyorsk on suspicion of illegal drug trade.

On 6 January 2007 Milinkevich was arrested twice: first on the suspicion of drunk driving (he was found to be sober) and then on the suspicion of being involved in a traffic accident. On 29 January 2007 Milinkevich said he was fined $2,200 after being tried in absentia for leaving Belarus illegally. He called it "revenge by Lukashenko".

See also
Knight of Freedom Award

References

External links

 British anti-Lukashenko
RFE/RL (January 30, 2006): Belarus: Milinkevich Says He Wants A Country Without Fear
BBC News (January 25, 2006): Poland greets Belarus opposition
BBC News (October 3, 2005): Belarus opposition closes ranks
RFE/RL (October 3, 2005): Belarus: Can The Opposition Unite To Challenge Lukashenka?
RFE/RL (October 3, 2005): Belarus: Opposition Candidate Hopes To Have Broad Public Support

1947 births
Living people
People from Grodno
Eastern Orthodox Christians from Belarus
United Democratic Forces of Belarus politicians
Candidates for President of Belarus
United Nations Human Rights Committee case law
Sakharov Prize laureates
20th-century Belarusian politicians
21st-century Belarusian politicians